Abigail Aldrich Rockefeller (November 9, 1903 – May 27, 1976) was an American philanthropist and the daughter of American financier John D. Rockefeller Jr. and a granddaughter of Standard Oil co-founder John D. Rockefeller.

Family background
Abigail was the first child and only daughter of philanthropists John Davison Rockefeller Jr. and Abigail Greene "Abby" Aldrich. She was commonly referred to as "Babs" to avoid confusion with her mother. She attended both the Chapin School and the Brearley School in New York City.

Philanthropy
She and her five brothers carried on the Rockefeller family tradition of philanthropy stemming back to their paternal grandparents, Standard Oil co-founder John Davison Rockefeller Sr. and schoolteacher Laura Celestia "Cettie" Spelman.

Unlike her famous brothers, she always remained out of the public eye. Among the many positions she held were: membership of the Board of Trustees of the Rockefeller Brothers Fund, set up by her and her brothers in 1940; advisory member of the Board of Trustees of the Memorial Sloan-Kettering Cancer Center, (a chief benefactor of the Center along with her brother, Laurance, she received its Medal of Appreciation in 1965); and honorary trustee of the Rockefeller Family Fund, founded by various family members in 1967.

She was also a benefactor of the Metropolitan Museum of Art, the YWCA, New York Hospital, the Museum of Modern Art (of which her mother was a founder, and in whose affairs her brothers Nelson and David played a major role); the New York Zoological Society (which was a major interest of her brother Laurance); and the Asia Society, which was established by another brother, John D. Rockefeller III.

In 1968 she created the Greenacre Foundation, of which she was president, in order to maintain and operate parks in New York State for the benefit of the public. She also made cash and stock contributions to East Woods School, The Metropolitan Museum of Art, the Rockefeller Brothers Fund, New York Hospital, the Population Council, the Planned Parenthood Federation of America, and the American Red Cross.

Personal life
Rockefeller married three times and had two children. Her first marriage took place on May 14, 1925, to David M. Milton (1900–1976), a lawyer and banker. Before their divorce in 1943, they had two daughters:
Abigail Rockefeller Milton (1928–2017), who married George Dorr O'Neill
Marilyn Ellen Milton (1931–1980), who married William Kelly Simpson (1928–2017), son of Kenneth F. Simpson, a Republican member of the United States House of Representatives from New York.
 Laura Knickerbacker Simpson (1954–2012), who married Grover O'Neill III in 1974.
 Abigail Rockefeller Simpson (b. 1958), who married Todd Mydland.
In 1946, she began her second marriage, to Dr. Irving H. Pardee (1892–1949), a neurologist and brother of cardiologist Harold E. B. Pardee. After his death in 1949, she married Jean Mauzé (1903–1974), a banker, on April 23, 1953. They remained married until his death in January 1974.

Rockefeller owned property in Bermuda, the Roman Corporation at One Beekman Place in New York City, and at the Pocantico family estate Kykuit in Westchester County, New York. She died on May 27, 1976, at her apartment in New York City.

See also
 Rockefeller family

Further reading
Rockefeller Archive Center: Brief biography
Memoirs, David Rockefeller, New York: Random House, 2002.

References

Rockefeller family
Winthrop family
Philanthropists from New York (state)
1903 births
1976 deaths
Chapin School (Manhattan) alumni
People from Manhattan
Brearley School alumni